Vignaud is a French surname. Notable people with the surname include:

Louis Vignaud (1929–2014), French Olympic shooter
Pierre Vignaud (born 1983), French footballer 
René Vignaud (1893–1969), French Olympic runner

French-language surnames